Faruk Sağnak (1 January 1924 – 23 February 2012) was a Turkish international footballer and manager. He died on 23 February 2012.

Sağnak was a one-club-man, played his entire career at Beşiktaş J.K. between 1943 and 1955.

References

External links
Profile at Turkish Football Federation

1924 births
2012 deaths
Footballers from Istanbul
Turkish footballers
Turkey international footballers
Beşiktaş J.K. footballers
Süper Lig players
Association football midfielders
Association football defenders